The 1894–95 season was the 24th season of competitive football in England.

League competitions

Football League
Following the collapse of Middlesbrough Ironopolis and the resignation of Northwich Victoria, three new teams were admitted to the Second Division, bringing it to 16 teams. These new teams were Bury, Leicester Fosse and Burton Wanderers.

Southern League
The Southern League, a competition for both professional and amateur clubs, was founded in 1894 under the initiative of Millwall Athletic (now simply Millwall), to cater for teams in southern England, who were unable to join the Football League. The nine founder members were:

Chatham
Clapton
Ilford
Luton Town
Millwall Athletic
Reading
Royal Ordnance Factories
2nd Scots Guards (later withdrew and were replaced by Southampton St Mary's)
Swindon Town

Events

 1 September 1894 – On the opening day of the Football League season, an extraordinary game between Sunderland and Derby County was played over three halves.  The referee appointed for the match, Tom Kirkham, was running late so John Conqueror took charge.  When Kirkham arrived, Sunderland were 3–0 ahead after the first half but the decision was made to start the match again at 0–0, annulling what was played so far.  The decision did not bother Sunderland in the end, as they officially ran out 8–0 winners.
 13 October 1894 – The Merseyside derby is contested for the first time. 44,000 watch Everton beat Liverpool 3–0 in a league clash at Goodison Park.

Honours

Notes = Number in parentheses is the times that club has won that honour. * indicates new record for competition

League tables

First Division

Second Division

References